Vašarište is a village in the municipality of Žepče, Bosnia and Herzegovina.

Demographics 
According to the 2013 census, its population was 566.

References

Populated places in Žepče